Micromolpus is a genus of leaf beetles in the subfamily Eumolpinae. It is distributed in New Guinea, and its name refers to "a small eumolpine beetle".

Species
 Micromolpus dodonaeae Gressitt, 1969
 Micromolpus pipturi Gressitt, 1969
 Micromolpus submetallica Gressitt, 1969
 Micromolpus triumfettae Gressitt, 1969

References

Eumolpinae
Chrysomelidae genera
Beetles of Oceania
Insects of New Guinea
Endemic fauna of New Guinea